Coelophora inaequalis, the variable ladybird, common Australian lady beetle or common Australian ladybug is a ladybird species endemic to Australia, Oceania and Southern Asia. The variable ladybird gets its name from the black markings on the adult elytra, that vary from one individual to another.

C. inaequalis was introduced into Florida and Hawaii as a biological control agent to combat Sipha flava, the yellow sugarcane aphid.

References

External links

 C. inaequalis picture gallery at www.ozanimals.com
 C. inaequalis picture gallery at www.brisbaneinsects.com

Coccinellidae
Beetles of Australia
Beetles of New Zealand
Beetles described in 1775
Taxa named by Johan Christian Fabricius